Natien is a village and rural commune in the Cercle of Sikasso in the Sikasso Region of southern Mali. The commune covers an area of 207 square kilometers and includes 9 villages. In the 2009 census it had a population of 7,404. The village of Natien, the administrative center (chef-lieu) of the commune, is 18 km west of Sikasso on the RN7, the main road linking Sikasso and Bougouni.

References

External links
.

Communes of Sikasso Region